The DFW R.II was a German bomber aircraft of World War I. It was developed at a request by the Luftstreitkräfte in spring 1917 after their experience with the R.I had been generally positive, but only two were ever built despite six being ordered.

Design and development
The service desired a generally similar aircraft to the R.1 but needed greater payload -  - than the 2600 kg of the R.I). This meant the design had to be considerably revised. The same arrangement of four inline engines mounted in the fuselage, driving two tractor propellers and two pusher propellers via long driveshaft was used.

When the R.II first flew in August 1918, the driveshafts proved troublesome, creating excessive vibration. As a remedy, they were enclosed within steel tubes, which fixed the problem. The aircraft also was able to benefit from the newly-available Mercedes D.IVa engine that had replaced the troublesome D.IV in production.

Transmission trouble with the shafts, geared up to 3000 rpm, was reported by pilots until improved versions cases and bearings were fitted to the planes. Reduction gears further lowered the propeller rpm to 900.

Operational history
Of the six ordered by the Luftstreitkräfte, only two were completed before the end of the war, and these were operated from Cologne on training duties only when their performance proved inadequate for front-line duties. Following the war, DFW planned an airliner version of the R.II, which would have carried 24 passengers. Construction of a prototype was abandoned before it was complete.

Specifications

See also

Notes

References

 The German Giants, The Story of the R-planes 1914-1919, G.W. Haddow & Peter M. Grosz, Putnam & Company Limited, 42 Great Russell Street, London,  First Published July 1962

External links
 "The German D.F.W. Commercial Four-Engined Biplane" Flight 25 September 1919, vol. XI, no. 39, pp. 1274–78. 

R.II
1910s German bomber aircraft
Four-engined push-pull aircraft
Mid-engined aircraft
Biplanes
Aircraft first flown in 1918